USS LST-487 was an  built for the United States Navy during World War II.

Construction
LST-487 was laid down on 2 January 1943, under Maritime Commission (MARCOM) contract, MC hull 1007, by Kaiser Shipyards, Yard No. 4, Richmond, California; launched on 23 January 1943;  and commissioned on 27 April 1943,

Service history 
During World War II, LST 487 was assigned to the Asian/Pacific theater and participated in the following operations: the Capture and occupation of Saipan in June and July 1944; the Tinian capture and occupation in July 1944; the Capture and occupation of southern Palau Island in September and October 1944; the Lingayen Gulf landing in January 1945; and the Assault and occupation of Okinawa Gunto in May 1945.

Battle of Saipan
At Saipan, she discharged vehicles and personnel for the attacking waves against the beach "Yellow Two". While on station, she received casualties from the beaches for treatment or burial. She suffered air attacks on 17 and 24 June, in which she was undamaged.

Battle of Tinian
At Tinian, she discharged LVTs and troops to the beaches of Tinian. She remained on the beach throughout the day of 25 July, performing recovery operations.

Post-war service
Following the war, LST-487 performed occupation duty in the Far East from 15 October, until 3 November 1945. Upon her return to the United States, she was decommissioned on 15 March 1946, and struck from the Navy list on 1 May 1946. On 20 February 1948, the ship was sold to Brown & Root, of Houston, Texas, for merchant service.

Awards
LST-487 earned five battle stars for World War II service.

Gallery

Notes 

Citations

Bibliography 

Online resources

External links

 

1943 ships
Ships built in Richmond, California
World War II amphibious warfare vessels of the United States
LST-1-class tank landing ships of the United States Navy
S3-M2-K2 ships